Ladies at Ease is a 1927 American silent comedy film directed by Jerome Storm and starring Pauline Garon, Gertrude Short and Gardner James.

Cast
 Pauline Garon as Polly 
 Gertrude Short as Mabel 
 Gardner James as Bill Brewster 
 Bob Custer as Buck Bevin 
 Lillian Hackett as Mae Dotty 
 Jean Van Vliet as June Dotty 
 William H. Strauss as Abe Ginsburg 
 Charles Meakin as John McMay

References

Bibliography
 Munden, Kenneth White. The American Film Institute Catalog of Motion Pictures Produced in the United States, Part 1. University of California Press, 1997.

External links
 

1927 films
1927 comedy films
1920s English-language films
American silent feature films
Silent American comedy films
Films directed by Jerome Storm
American black-and-white films
1920s American films